"Je ne sais pas pourquoi", also known as "I Still Love You (Je ne sais pas pourquoi)" in Australia and New Zealand, is a song by Australian recording artist and songwriter Kylie Minogue from her debut studio album Kylie (1988). Released as a single on 10 October 1988  by PWL, the song has subsequently appeared on most of Minogue's hits compilations including Greatest Hits (1992), Ultimate Kylie (2004) and, most recently,  Step Back in Time: The Definitive Collection, released in 2019. Like most of Minogue's material between 1988 and 1992, it was written and produced by Stock Aitken Waterman.

Background
The song, with its French inspired theme and accompanying video, was released as the fourth single in October 1988, and was taken from the debut studio album Kylie. It was written and produced by Stock Aitken Waterman, who produced Minogue's first four studio albums. The title of the song varied in different parts of the world. In Australia and New Zealand it was retitled "I Still Love You" followed by the original French title in brackets. In some parts of Europe, there was a further variation, "Je ne sais pas pourquoi (I Still Love You)" but although the 7" single had different titles depending on the territory of release, the song itself is the same.

"Je ne sais pas pourquoi" is a teen-pop ballad, which is also inspired by dance-pop, which features instrumentals including drum machine, synthesizers, and some minor guitar riffs. Producer Pete Waterman claimed the idea for the use of French in the song came from observing the fascination that many younger fans had with language and mastering pronunciation.

A substantially different early demo version of "Je ne sais pas pourquoi" is known to exist, although it has never been officially released. This version is said to have a completely different intro and is of a slightly faster tempo and has a stronger beat. Mike Stock uploaded 2 versions of the Demo's, with Kylie's original vocals, to his website in July 2020.

Commercially, the song received good chart success, peaking in the top ten in countries including Finland (where it peaked at number one), Ireland, New Zealand and the United Kingdom, while peaking in the top twenty in countries like Australia, France, Germany, and Norway. Pete Waterman said he believed the song would not have been a hit had it not been for Minogue's huge appeal as a pop star. 

"Je ne sais pas pourquoi" had been performed at Minogue's world tours such as Disco in Dream/The Hitman Roadshow, Enjoy Yourself Tour, Rhythm of Love Tour, Let's Get To It Tour, Showgirl: The Greatest Hits Tour, and the Summer 2019 Tour.

Music video
The video is meant to look like it is shot in Paris in the '40s or '50s as Minogue waits in the rain for her date to arrive and then heads to a café. Minogue's hair is set in waves and she is wearing a blue dress and matching angora cardigan. This is later intercut with a street scene that is filmed in black and white and depicts Minogue wearing a floral dress as she dances with a man. Minogue is the only colourful part of the scene.

"Made in Heaven"

"Made in Heaven" was released as the single's B-side and also was written and produced by Stock, Aitken and Waterman. It was a new song which was not included on the album Kylie and an extended remix was also included on the 12" single. A promotional video was produced for "Made in Heaven" which was first issued on the Stock Aitken Waterman hits compilation, The Hit Factory Volume 3 and later on the Greatest Hits 1987–1997 compilation.

In the UK territory, "Je ne sais pas pourquoi" was originally planned to be released as a double A-side with "Made in Heaven". The original plan was to heavily promote "Je ne sais pas pourquoi" during the singles' early chart run, and once the song had peaked, the single would be officially 'flipped' and promotional emphasis shifted to "Made in Heaven" which would become the listed A-side. This marketing tactic had been used similarly with Rick Astley's single "When I Fall In Love"/"My Arms Keep Missing You" with the latter song becoming the singles' 'official' A-side after Christmas 1987. However, after reaching number 2 for 3 consecutive weeks, "Je ne sais pas pourquoi", although included on the widely available Kylie album, performed so well on its own that the plans to release it as a double A-side single were changed.

The video to "Made to Heaven" solely involves Minogue dancing in front of a bluescreen with images of her previous five videos sampled behind her. She was surrounded by a halo of light and it was the last video before she began to routinely involve dancers and choreographed routines in her videos and performances. Kylie performed "Made in Heaven" at the "Royal Variety Performance" in front of the Queen Mother where she announced it as her new song - "Made in Heaven" was however never released as an A-side anywhere but it was used as the B-side to the international releases of both "It's No Secret" and "Turn It into Love". "Je ne sais pas pourquoi" was the 20th biggest selling single of 1988 in the UK.

Chart performance
"I Still Love You (Je ne sais pas pourquoi)" debuted at number thirteen on the Australian Singles Chart and four weeks later, it rose to number 11. After this, it slowly fell off the charts. In New Zealand, it debuted at number thirty-eight on the New Zealand Singles Chart, until it peaked at number 9 the following week.

The song debuted at number 33 on the French Singles Chart, until peaking at number 15, and stayed in the chart for fifteen weeks. The song debuted at number 87 on the Dutch Top 40, and peaked at number 43. The song spent a sole week in Norway at number 10. In Switzerland, the song debuted at number 24, where it peaked, but stayed in the top twenty-five for four weeks, until completely dropping off the charts. In Germany, it peaked at number 14 and in Ireland, the song made number 2.

The song was most successful in the United Kingdom where it debuted at number 11 on the UK Singles Chart, until rising to number 2, staying there for three consecutive weeks (only behind Enya's "Orinoco Flow"), becoming Kylie's fourth consecutive Top 2 hit in less than a year. The song stayed in the charts for fourteen weeks and went on to sell 315,000 copies. In the United States, the song was released as  "I Still Love You (Je ne sais pas pourquoi)", but did not reach the Billboard Hot 100.

Formats and track listings
These are the formats and track listings of major single releases of "Je ne sais pas pourquoi".

CD single

 "Je ne sais pas pourquoi" (Moi Non Plus mix) – 5:55
 "Made in Heaven" (Maid in England mix) – 6:20
 "The Loco-Motion" (Sankie mix – long version) – 6:55

7-inch single

 "Je ne sais pas pourquoi" – 4:01
 "Made in Heaven" – 3:24

12-inch single

 "Je ne sais pas pourquoi" (Moi Non Plus mix) – 5:55
 "Made in Heaven" (Maid in England mix) – 6:20

UK 12-inch remix

 "Je ne sais pas pourquoi" (The Revolutionary mix) – 7:16
 "Made in Heaven" (Maid in England mix) – 6:20

US 12-inch single

 "Je ne sais pas pourquoi" (Moi Non Plus mix) – 5:55
 "Je ne sais pas pourquoi" (The Revolutionary mix) – 7:16
 "Made in Heaven" (Maid in England mix) – 6:20

Live performances
Minogue performed the song on the following concert tours:
 Disco in Dream/The Hitman Roadshow
 Enjoy Yourself Tour
 Rhythm of Love Tour
 Showgirl: The Greatest Hits Tour
 Summer 2019

Charts and certifications

Weekly charts

Year-end charts

Certifications

|}

References

1988 singles
1988 songs
Franglais songs
Geffen Records singles
Kylie Minogue songs
Mushroom Records singles
Number-one singles in Finland
Pete Waterman Entertainment singles
Pop ballads
Song recordings produced by Stock Aitken Waterman
Songs written by Matt Aitken
Songs written by Mike Stock (musician)
Songs written by Pete Waterman
UK Independent Singles Chart number-one singles